Geraldine Harris (born 1951), aka Geraldine Harris Pinch, is an author (of both fiction and non-fiction) and Egyptologist. She is a member of the Faculty of Oriental Studies at the University of Oxford.

Her works include the Seven Citadels quartet and numerous information text books about Egypt.

Partial bibliography
White Cranes Castle, illustrated by Lisa Jensen, Macmillan (London), 1979.
"Seven Citadels" series
Prince of the Godborn, Greenwillow (New York City), 1982.
The Children of the Wind, Greenwillow, 1982.
The Dead Kingdom, Greenwillow, 1983.
The Seventh Gate, Greenwillow, 1983.
Gods and Pharaohs from Egyptian Mythology, illustrated by John Sibbick and David O'Connor, Lowe (London), 1982, Schocken (New York City), 1983, reprinted, P. Bedrick (New York City), 1996.
The Junior Atlas of Ancient Egypt, Lionheart (London), 1989.
New Kingdom Votive Offerings to Hathor, Griffith Institute (Oxford), 1989.
Isis and Osiris, NTC Pub. Group, 1996.
(Co-authored with Delia Pemberton) Illustrated Encyclopedia of Ancient Egypt, Peter Bedrick Books, 1999.
Egyptian Mythology: A Guide to the Gods, Goddesses, and Traditions of ancient Egypt. Oxford University Press, 2004. 
Contributor to journals, including Folklore and Orientalia.

Notes

References

External links
 Home page
 Site about the Seven Citadels series

1951 births
Living people
British Egyptologists
British fantasy writers
British women archaeologists
20th-century British women writers
21st-century British women writers